The 2020 season was the San Francisco 49ers' 71st in the National Football League (NFL), their 75th overall, and their fourth under the head coach/general manager tandem of Kyle Shanahan and John Lynch. The 49ers entered the season as the defending NFC champions; however, the 49ers failed to improve on their 13–3 season after a Week 8 loss to the Seattle Seahawks and were eliminated from playoff contention after a Week 15 loss to the Dallas Cowboys. 

The season saw many key players missing significant time due to injuries, including starting quarterback Jimmy Garoppolo and 2019 Defensive Rookie of the Year Nick Bosa. The 49ers season ended with a league-high 18 players on injured reserve. Another notable event was the suspension of home games in Santa Clara County due to the ongoing COVID-19 pandemic, forcing the 49ers to play their final three home games at State Farm Stadium in Glendale, Arizona.

Offseason

Roster changes

Free agency
The 49ers entered free agency with the following:

Signings

Departures

Trades 
 On October 27, the 49ers traded their 2022 sixth-round selection to the New York Jets for defensive end Jordan Willis and 2021 seventh-round selection.
 On November 2, the 49ers traded Kwon Alexander to the New Orleans Saints in exchange for a fifth-round conditional pick in the 2021 NFL Draft and LB Kiko Alonso.

Draft

Notes
 The 49ers traded LB Eli Harold to the Detroit Lions in exchange for a conditional seventh-round selection.
 The 49ers traded their second-round selection to the Kansas City Chiefs in exchange for DE Dee Ford.
 The 49ers traded their third- and fourth-round selections to the Denver Broncos in exchange for WR Emmanuel Sanders and Denver's fifth-round selection.
 The 49ers traded DT DeForest Buckner to the Indianapolis Colts in exchange for a first-round selection (No. 13th overall).
 The 49ers traded their first- and a seventh-round selection (13th and 245th overall) to Tampa Bay Buccaneers in exchange for a first- and a fourth-round pick (14th and 117th overall).
 The 49ers traded their first-, fourth- and fifth-round selections (31st, 117th and 176th overall) to Minnesota Vikings in exchange for a first-round pick (No. 25th overall).
 The 49ers traded their RB Matt Breida to Miami Dolphins in exchange for a fifth-round pick (No. 153rd overall).
 The 49ers traded their fifth-round selection (No. 156th overall) and a 2021 third-round selection to Washington Redskins in exchange for OT Trent Williams.
 The 49ers traded their WR Marquise Goodwin and a sixth-round selection (No. 210th overall) to Philadelphia Eagles in exchange for a sixth-round selection (No. 190th overall).

Undrafted free agents

Staff

Final roster

Preseason
The 49ers' preseason schedule was announced on May 7, but was later canceled due to the COVID-19 pandemic.

Regular season

Schedule
The 49ers' 2020 schedule was announced on May 7.

Game summaries

Week 1: vs. Arizona Cardinals

Week 2: at New York Jets

Although the 49ers won easily over the struggling Jets, they suffered devastating injuries on both sides of the ball to Jimmy Garoppolo, Raheem Mostert, Tevin Coleman, Nick Bosa, and Solomon Thomas. It got so bad the team's MRI truck broke down.

Week 3: at New York Giants

With Jimmy Garoppolo sidelined, Nick Mullens made his first start since 2018. He threw for 343 yards and a touchdown in a blowout win over the Giants.

Week 4: vs. Philadelphia Eagles

With this loss, the 49ers dropped to 2–2. Nick Mullens struggled mightily in the game with two interceptions, one of which was returned by Alex Singleton for a touchdown, and was benched afterwards for C. J. Beathard. The 49ers drove all the way to within field goal range down by 5, but the clock ran out.

Week 5: vs. Miami Dolphins

With this embarrassing loss, the 49ers dropped to 2–3, already matching last season's loss total. Jimmy Garoppolo returned from injury but struggled mightily with 2 interceptions, leading to him being benched at halftime for C. J. Beathard.

Week 6: vs. Los Angeles Rams

The 49ers bounced back from the previous week. Jimmy Garoppolo threw 3 touchdowns and 268 yards and the 49ers defense was able to hold a red-hot Rams offense in check. With this win, they improved to 3–3, and won their third straight meeting against the Rams.

Week 7: at New England Patriots

This was quarterback Jimmy Garoppolo's first return to New England since the Patriots traded him to the 49ers in October 2017. Garoppolo played for the Patriots from 2014 to 2017, and was part of their 2014 and 2016 Super Bowl-winning teams.

Week 8: at Seattle Seahawks

At one point, the 49ers were down 7-30. Despite outscoring the Seahawks 20-7 for the rest of the game, the 49ers dropped to 4-4.

Week 9: vs. Green Bay Packers

In a rematch of the NFC Championship the previous season. Aaron Rodgers threw for 305 yards and 4 touchdowns as the Packers went up 34–3 before the 49ers scored two meaningless touchdowns to make the final score 34–17 and dropping the 49ers to 4–5. As of week 9, the 49ers have a league high 24 players on the reserve lists.

Week 10: at New Orleans Saints

Week 12: at Los Angeles Rams

The 49ers returned from their bye week with some much-needed reinforcement returning from injury: on offense, Raheem Mostert scored a touchdown and 43 yards rushing and Deebo Samuel had 133 receiving yards; on defense, Richard Sherman contributed by grabbing his first interception of the season. The game was largely a defensive struggle. The two teams had four combined turnovers in the first quarter, and the only points scored in the first half came on a Raheem Mostert touchdown and a Matt Gay field goal. Early in the third quarter, the 49ers padded their lead to fourteen points with Javon Kinlaw's pick six and a Robbie Gould field goal. However, the momentum changed quickly as Aaron Donald forced a fumble on Raheem Mostert and it was returned for a touchdown by Troy Hill. The Rams soon scored again on a touchdown run from Cam Akers to take a three-point lead. The Rams' final drives quickly turned to punts while Nick Mullens led the 49ers on two drives resulting in field goals, including the 42-yard game winner by Robbie Gould with no time on the clock.

With the win, the 49ers swept the Rams for the second straight year.

Week 13: vs. Buffalo Bills
 Due to the COVID-19 pandemic in Santa Clara County halting all contact sports the 49ers decided to use State Farm Stadium for 2 games

Week 14: vs. Washington Football Team

Week 15: at Dallas Cowboys

The 49ers traveled to Dallas hoping to keep their season alive, but struggled throughout the game. The 49ers immediately trailed 17–7, and turned the ball over 4 times against one of the worst defenses in the NFL. Despite fighting back and forth after tying the game, the 49ers never had the lead. San Francisco also allowed Cowboys wide receiver CeeDee Lamb to return a kickoff for a touchdown, which sealed the 49ers' loss. This loss, combined with the Cardinals' victory over the Eagles, the 49ers were eliminated from playoff contention.

Week 16: at Arizona Cardinals

With this win, the San Francisco 49ers finished 5-3 in away games.

Week 17: vs. Seattle Seahawks

With this loss, the 49ers finished 1-7 at home and are 1-5 in their last 6 games against Seattle.

Standings

Division

Conference

Notes

References

External links
 
 

San Francisco
San Francisco 49ers seasons
San Francisco 49ers